Desperado may refer to:

 Outlaw, particularly in the American Old West

Books
 Desperadoes (comics), a comic book series
 Desperadoes (novel), a 1979 novel by Ron Hansen
 Desperado Publishing, an American independent comic book publisher

Film and television 
 Desperado (film series), a series of five TV movies from 1987 to 1989
 Desperado (film), a 1995 action thriller with Antonio Banderas
 Desperados (film), a 2020 American comedy film
 The Desperadoes, a 1943 Western starring Randolph Scott and Claire Trevor
 The Desperados, a 1969 Western starring Vince Edwards and Jack Palance
 Desperados (TV series), a UK children's drama show
 The Dirty Outlaws, a 1967 western also known as El Desperado or The Desperado

Games 
 Desperado (chess), a chess piece that seems determined to give itself up
 Desperados (video game series):
 Desperados: Wanted Dead or Alive, a 2001 stealth-based real-time tactics computer game
 Desperados 2: Cooper's Revenge, the 2006 sequel to Desperados: Wanted Dead or Alive
 Desperados III, the 2020 prequel to Desperados: Wanted Dead or Alive
 Gun.Smoke, a 1985 video game, ported to some systems as Desperado - Gun.Smoke

Amusement rides 
 Desperado (roller coaster), a roller coaster at Buffalo Bill's casino in Primm, Nevada
 Desperados (ride), a collective amusement ride

Music

Bands
 Desperado (band), an American heavy metal band
 Desperadoes Steel Orchestra, Trinidad steel band
 Dezperadoz, a German "Western metal" band

Albums
 Desperado: The Soundtrack, a soundtrack album from the 1995 film
 Desperado (Eagles album), Second studio album by the Eagles, 1973
 Desperado (Pat Martino album), 1970, or the title song
 Desperado (High Rise album), 1998, or the title song

Songs
"Desperado" (Eagles song), a song by the Eagles
"Desperado" (Rihanna song), a song by Rihanna 2016
"Desperado", a song by Alice Cooper from Killer
"Desperado", a song by Eve of Destiny
"Desperado", a song by Azealia Banks from Broke with Expensive Taste
"Desperado", a song by Kenny Rogers from Daytime Friends
"Desperados", a song by Hanoi Rocks

Sports 
 El Desperado (wrestler), Japanese professional wrestler
 Dallas Desperados, a franchise in the Arena Football League

 The Desperados, a professional wrestling stable consisting of Dutch Mantel, Black Bart and Deadeye Dick (Randy Colley)

Other
 Desperados (beer), a lager produced by Karlovačko Brewery